Rishon may refer to:

 Rishonim, an era of Rabbis and Poskim
 Rishon LeZion, a city in Israel
 Rishon model, a preonic model of sub-quark particle physics.